André Luiz Barreto Silva Lima (born 3 May 1985), commonly known as André Lima, is a Brazilian professional footballer who last played as a striker for Austin Bold. He plays as a striker.

Club career
Born in Rio de Janeiro, Lima was a youth player with Vasco da Gama until 2004 when he joined the senior team. Lima played for various teams in Brazil, as well as Germinal Beerschot in Belgium, before joining Botafogo. He was the joint top-scorer for Botafogo for the 2007 Copa do Brasil, in which they lost in the semifinal.

On 28 August 2007, Lima signed a four year contract with Bundesliga side Hertha BSC with a transfer fee of €3.5 million. In Lima's first season, he played 16 games, scoring two goals. Lima was the third choice striker for Hertha coach Lucien Favre, and struggled in his first season. As a result, Lima was sent on loan to São Paulo on 28 June 2008 for a year long loan.

Lima would go on to be loaned to several additional Brazilian sides. This included scoring 14 goals across all competitions for Botafogo in their 2009 season. However, general manager Michael Preetz indicated that Hertha already had two strikers and were looking for a team to buy Lima. Lima would be loaned out again, this time to Grêmio, where he would play for three years.

On 17 February 2013, Lima was signed by Chinese Super League side Beijing Guoan. After leaving Beijing Guoan, he would continue to play in the Brazilian first division, playing for Avaí FC, Atlético Paranaense, and Vitória.

On 24 January 2019, Lima joined Austin Bold FC of the USL Championship. During the COVID-19 crisis, Lima opted to stay with his family in Orlando, Florida and mutually agreed to terminate his contract with Austin.

Honours
Copa do Brasil top scorer: 2007

References

External links
 
 

Living people
1985 births
Footballers from Rio de Janeiro (city)
Association football forwards
Brazilian footballers
CR Vasco da Gama players
Beerschot A.C. players
Madureira Esporte Clube players
Sampaio Corrêa Futebol Clube players
Botafogo de Futebol e Regatas players
Hertha BSC players
São Paulo FC players
Fluminense FC players
Grêmio Foot-Ball Porto Alegrense players
Beijing Guoan F.C. players
Esporte Clube Vitória players
Avaí FC players
Club Athletico Paranaense players
Austin Bold FC players
Campeonato Brasileiro Série A players
Bundesliga players
Chinese Super League players
USL Championship players
Brazilian expatriate footballers
Brazilian expatriate sportspeople in Belgium
Expatriate footballers in Belgium
Brazilian expatriate sportspeople in Germany
Expatriate footballers in Germany
Brazilian expatriate sportspeople in China
Expatriate footballers in China
Brazilian expatriate sportspeople in the United States
Expatriate soccer players in the United States